Sinyi Elementary School is a station on the Orange line of Kaohsiung MRT in Sinsing District, Kaohsiung, Taiwan. It will be a future transfer station with the Yellow line.

Station overview

The station is a two-level, underground station with an island platform and five exits. The station is 215 meters long and is located at the intersection of Jhongjheng 2nd Rd. and Minzu 2nd Rd.

Station layout

Exits
Exit 1: Sinyi Elementary School (west), Jintian Rd., Sinsing District Administrative Center 
Exit 2: Sinyi Elementary School (east), Kaifeng Rd.
Exit 3: Jintian Rd.,
Exit 4: Minzu 2nd Rd., Dingsin Park
Exit 5: Minzu 2nd Rd., Cathay Jhongjheng Building, Cafe Hondo

Around the station
 Sinyi Elementary School
 Kaohsiung City Government Fire Department
 The Lees Hotel
 PEG Asia org / TC English Ltd.
 Woman Service Center of Social Affairs Bureau
 Cathay Jhongjheng Building
 Vepsi Tower
 Hong Fa Temple
 Water Tower Park

References

2008 establishments in Taiwan
Kaohsiung Metro Orange line stations
Railway stations opened in 2008